Lac de Roy is a lake in Haute-Savoie, France. It is located 2 km west of le Praz de Lys (Praz de Lys-Sommand?) ski resort, in the commune of Taninges.

Roy, Lac